Madam is a village in Hamdan District of Sanaa Governorate, Yemen.

History 
Madam is mentioned by the 10th-century writer Abu Muhammad al-Hasan al-Hamdani in his Sifat Jazirat al-Arab, in a section about places mentioned in Arabic poetry. He describes it as a place in Hamdan, but does not quote any corresponding verses. The 13th-century writer Yaqut al-Hamawi also mentions Madam.

References 

Villages in Sanaa Governorate